Zygogynum is a genus of plant in the winter's bark family Winteraceae. 19 species are native to New Caledonia, and are pollinated primarily by beetles and moths. Other species are native to New Guinea (21 species), the Bismarck Archipelago (1 species), the Solomon Islands (2 species), Lord Howe Island (1 species), and Queensland (2 species).

This genus is interesting for having the greatest range in the  number of stamens in any genus: as few as three or as many as 370; a 123 fold difference in the number of stamens. The number of carpels can range from one to as many as fifty.

Species
The genus includes 45 accepted species:
 Zygogynum acsmithii Vink – southeastern New Caledonia
 Zygogynum amplexicaule (Vieill. ex P.Parm.) Vink – northern and western New Caledonia
 Zygogynum archboldianum (A.C.Sm.) Vink – western New Guinea
 Zygogynum argenteum (A.C.Sm.) Vink – New Guinea
 Zygogynum baillonii Tiegh. – southeastern New Caledonia
 Zygogynum bicolor Tiegh. – central New Caledonia
 Zygogynum bosavicum Vink – New Guinea
 Zygogynum bullatum (Diels) Vink – Mt. Stolle, New Guinea
 Zygogynum calophyllum (A.C.Sm.) Vink – New Guinea
 Zygogynum calothyrsum (Diels) Vink – New Guinea
 Zygogynum clemensiae (A.C.Sm.) Vink – New Guinea
 Zygogynum comptonii (Baker f.) Vink - northern New Caledonia
 Zygogynum crassifolium (Baill.) Vink – New Caledonia
 Zygogynum cristatum Vink – central New Caledonia
 Zygogynum cruminatum Vink – New Guinea
 Zygogynum cyclopensis Vink – New Guinea
 Zygogynum fraterculus Vink – New Caledonia
 Zygogynum haplopus (B.L.Burtt) Vink – Solomon Islands
 Zygogynum howeanum (F.Muell.) Vink – Lord Howe Island
 Zygogynum ledermannii (Diels) Vink – New Guinea
 Zygogynum longifolium (A.C.Sm.) Vink – New Guinea and Bismarck Archipelago
 Zygogynum mackeei Vink – northern New Caledonia
 Zygogynum megacarpum (A.C.Sm.) Vink – western New Guinea
 Zygogynum montanum (Lauterb.) Vink – Papua New Guinea
 Zygogynum oligocarpum (Schltr.) Vink – Papua New Guinea
 Zygogynum oligostigma Vink – central New Caledonia
 Zygogynum pachyanthum (A.C.Sm.) Vink – New Guinea
 Zygogynum pancheri (Baill.) Vink – east-central and southeastern New Caledonia
 Zygogynum pauciflorum (Baker f.) Vink – Mont Panié, northern New Caledonia
 Zygogynum polyneurum (Diels) Vink – western New Guinea
 Zygogynum pomiferum Baill. – northern and central New Caledonia
 Zygogynum queenslandianum (Vink) Vink – northeastern Queensland
 Zygogynum schlechteri (Guillaumin) Vink – southeastern New Caledonia
 Zygogynum schramii Vink – western New Guinea
 Zygogynum semecarpoides (F.Muell.) Vink – northeastern Queensland
 Zygogynum sororium (Diels) Vink – Schrader Range, Papua New Guinea
 Zygogynum staufferianum Vink – Papua New Guinea
 Zygogynum stipitatum Baill. – northern and central New Caledonia
 Zygogynum sylvestre (A.C.Sm.) Vink – New Guinea
 Zygogynum tanyostigma Vink – Mont Panié, northern New Caledonia
 Zygogynum tieghemii Vink – central and southeastern New Caledonia
 Zygogynum umbellatum (Ridl.) Vink – New Guinea
 Zygogynum vieillardii Baill. – central and southeastern New Caledonia
 Zygogynum vinkii F.B.Sampson – central New Caledonia
 Zygogynum whitmoreanum Vink – Solomon Islands

References

 
Taxonomy articles created by Polbot
Taxa named by Henri Ernest Baillon
Australasian realm flora
Canellales genera